Silueta may refer to:
Silueta (wrestler)
Silueta (album), album by Ana Gabriel